Muuido, also known as Muui Island, is an island in South Korea. It is a small island located south of Yongyu Island, which was joined with Yeongjong Island when Incheon International Airport was built. The island is visible from the airport. 

Muui Island is served by a daily ferry from Incheon ferry terminal on the mainland, as well as by a frequent car ferry which crosses the narrow channel separating the island from Yongyu Island. Buses run from the airport and the Incheon Airport Maglev will also provide service to nearby Yongyu station. With the opening of Muui Bridge between Muui and Yeongjong, ferry service to the island has been reduced.

The island's name, "Muui", means "dancer's dress" in Korean. It is a beautiful spot popular with locals and expat tourists, who like to visit the two main beaches of the island, Silmi Beach and Hanagae Beach. 

Muuido is mentioned in Eugene Clark's Korean War narrative The Secrets of Incheon.

Hanagae

Hanagae is about a kilometer long and has a vast tidal flat.

It has small cabanas on the beach for overnight lodging, and an assortment of local restaurants and hotels. There are many shellfish on the shores of the island. At Hanagae Beach, people can catch crabs, clams, snails, surf clams, and horned turbans. Hanagae has an outdoor stage and has hosted festivals, including the punk festival IT'S A FEST and Muuido Summer Sea Dance Festival.

Silmido

Silmi Island is a smaller uninhabited island located off the NW shore of Muui Island. It is famously the former training site for Unit 684, as depicted in the film Silmido.

External links

 GSC.gov - Official GSC Organizational Site
  Muuido homepage
 Korea Tourism Official Site
 Islands in the area
 Oi-do Island

References 

Islands of Incheon
Islands of the Yellow Sea